Clifford J. Cunningham is a Canadian-Scottish professional astronomer and author of numerous books on asteroids.

Biography 

He obtained his Bachelor of Science degree from the University of Waterloo; upon enrollment, at age 15, he was the youngest student ever to attend UW. In 1991 he earned his BA in Classical Studies. For his book Introduction to Asteroids (1988) and development of The Minor Planet Index to Scientific Papers (currently on the small bodies node of the Planetary Data System managed by NASA), an asteroid was named in his honour. Asteroid 4276 was named Clifford. He is a contributing editor to Mercury magazine (since 2001), and a contributor to The Astronomical Calendar (1988–2013). In 1999 he appeared as a Starfleet officer on the TV show Star Trek: Deep Space Nine. In 2013 he became affiliated with NARIT, the National Astronomical Research Institute of Thailand. In 2016 he was appointed associate editor of the Journal of Astronomical History & Heritage, and in 2014 a contributor to Encyclopædia Britannica. In 2020 he was one of 100 world experts commissioned by Britannica to write its Kid's Encyclopedia. He earned his PhD in the history of astronomy at the University of Southern Queensland (USQ) in Australia in 2015. He is now a Research Fellow at USQ, and became Series Editor of Historical and Cultural Astronomy books for Springer in June 2019. In 2020 he was elected to membership in the International Astronomical Union (IAU), and as of 2022 is a member of Commission 3 (History of Astronomy).

After years of research, Dr. Cunningham finally discovered who coined the word 'asteroid'. Although 'asteroid' has been attributed to the famous astronomer William Herschel, Cunningham found evidence that it was proposed by Greek expert Charles Burney Jr., the son of a friend of Herschel. In 2014 he discovered a previously unrecognised allusion to the aurora borealis in Milton's Paradise Lost. In 2020 he published evidence that Manilius, not Hipparchus, developed the numerical stellar magnitude system. His seventh asteroid book was published in 2021.

Awards and honors 

In 1990, the Mars-crossing asteroid 4276 Clifford, discovered by American astronomer Edward Bowell in 1981, was named in his honor. The official  was published by the Minor Planet Center on 10 April 1990.

Publications 
 Introduction to Asteroids (1988) published by Willmann-Bell Inc., Richmond, Virginia. 
 Discovery of the Missing Correspondence between Carl Friedrich Gauss and the Rev. Nevil Maskelyne (2004) – 
 How the First Dwarf Planet Became the Asteroid Ceres (2009) – 
 The Attribution of Classical Deities in the Iconography of Giuseppe Piazzi (2011) – 
 Giuseppe Piazzi: the controversial discovery and loss of Ceres in 1801. (2011) – 
 Olbers's Planetary Explosion Hypothesis. (2013)  – 
 Classical Deities in Astronomy: The Employment of Verse to Commemorate the Discovery of the Planets Uranus, Ceres, Pallas, Juno and Vesta. (2013). – 
 Discovery of the origin of the word "asteroid" and the Related Terms "asteroidal", "planetoid", "planetkin", "planetule" and "cometoid." (2015) – 
 The Clash Between William Herschel and the Great German ‘Amateur’ Astronomer Johann Schroeter. In: New Insights from Recent Studies in Historical Astronomy, 205–222. (2015), published by Springer. 
 Milton's Paradise Lost: Previously Unrecognized Allusions to the Aurora Borealis, and a Solution to the Comet Conundrum in Book 2. (2016). – 
 Discovery of the First Asteroid Ceres (2016), published by Springer. 
 Early Investigations of Ceres, and the Discovery of Pallas (2016), published by Springer. 
 Studies of Pallas in the Early Nineteenth Century (2017), published by Springer. 
 Bode's Law and the Discovery of Juno (2017), published by Springer. 
 Investigating the Origin of the Asteroids and Early Findings on Vesta (2017), published by Springer. 
 The Scientific Legacy of William Herschel (2017), edited by Clifford Cunningham, published by Springer. 
 The Collected Correspondence of Baron Franz Xaver von Zach; 7 volumes published between 2004 and 2009
 Herschel's Spurious Moons of Uranus: Their Impact on Satellite Orbital Theory, Celestial Cartography and Literature. (2020) – 
 'Dark Stars' and a New Interpretation of the Ancient Greek Stellar Magnitude System. (2020) – 
 The Seven Sisters: A Pleiades Cantata. (2021) – 
 Asteroids (2021) published by Reaktion Press, London. 
 Some Early Astrological Musings on Asteroids. (2021) – 
 The Origins and Legacy of Kepler's Gap. In: Towards Mysteries of the Cosmos with Johannes Kepler on the 450th Anniversary of His Birth, 95–132. (2022), published by Jagiellonian University Astronomical Observatory and Astronomia Nova Association.

See also
 List of University of Waterloo people

References 

1955 births
21st-century Canadian astronomers
Living people
20th-century Canadian astronomers